"The Negotiation" is the 20th episode of the ABC series FlashForward.

Synopsis

On the day before the blackout, Mark (Joseph Fiennes) does everything he can to protect Gabriel (James Callis). Janis (Christine Woods) is ordered to kill Mark, but doesn't know if she can go along with this. Also, Aaron's (Brían F. O'Byrne) life is in danger when he gets closer to finding his daughter.

Title sequence image
A metal flask (which actually does not appear in the episode).

Reception
This episode was watched by 4.84 million American viewers with an 18–49 rating of 1.3. This episode received a 7.6 rating out of 10 by IGN. The A.V. Club gave the episode a D. Television Without Pity gave this episode a B−.

References

2010 American television episodes
FlashForward episodes